Kumar Navale (born 1897, date of death unknown) was an Indian wrestler. He competed in the freestyle middleweight event at the 1920 Summer Olympics.

References

External links
 

1897 births
Year of death missing
Olympic wrestlers of India
Wrestlers at the 1920 Summer Olympics
Indian male sport wrestlers
Place of birth missing